Gioacchino Vitelli, (Torre del Greco, born circa 1785)  was an Italian painter of portraits and sacred subjects. In 1814, he painted a copy of Andrea Sabatini's Adoration of Magi for the Duomo di Salerno.

References

1780s births
19th-century Italian painters
Italian male painters
Painters from Naples
Year of death missing
19th-century Italian male artists